CEP85L, for "Centrosomal Protein 85kDa-Like" is a gene which encodes a protein that has been identified as a breast cancer antigen. Nothing more is known of its function at this time. Three transcript variants encoding different isoforms have been found for this gene. It has been shown to be related to the QT interval in GWAS studies.

Pathology
Mutations of the CEP85L gene were associated with posterior predominant lissencephaly in a 2020 study.

See also 
Centrosome - the product of the gene localizes in the centrosome

Sources  

Genes on human chromosome 6
Centrosome